ad-Duwwara is a Palestinian village located four kilometers east of Hebron.The village is in the Hebron Governorate Southern West Bank. According to the Palestinian Central Bureau of Statistics, the village had a population of 1,685 in mid-year 2006. The primary health care facilities for the village are located at Beit Einun, which are designated by the Ministry of Health as level 2.

Footnotes

External links

Villages in the West Bank
Hebron Governorate
Municipalities of the State of Palestine